The World Wrestling Network is an American professional wrestling organization known for and branded after its video streaming service, WWNLive. WWNLive hosts content both from WWN's "brands", including Full Impact Pro (FIP) and Shine Wrestling, as well as content from third-party organizations.

History
World Wrestling Network was founded by Sal Hamaoui and Tony Valamontes in 2001 as a DVD company before it later evolved into an internet streaming and video on demand business. In 2003, WWNLive began producing FIP DVDs.

In November 2014, Evolve Wrestling, Dragon Gate USA (DGUSA), Full Impact Pro (FIP) and Shine Wrestling held a tour of China under the WWNLive banner. The following month, WWNLive announced a long-term deal with Great-Wall International Sports Management for regular tours of Asia, starting in the spring of 2015.

In 2015, WWNLive opened a training facility in Trinity, Florida named the "World Wrestling Network Academy". That year, Evolve began a partnership with WWE. Evolve's wrestlers were featured on WWE.com, while NXT wrestlers Sami Zayn, Chad Gable and Jason Jordan took part in Evolve events in non-wrestling roles. In January 2016, NXT General Manager William Regal and WWE COO Triple H attended Evolve 54. As part of the relationship, it was announced in March 2016 that Evolve would hold qualifying matches for WWE's Cruiserweight Classic.

On October 24, 2016, WWNLive and FloSports announced a new streaming service to launch on November 4. Through the service, subscribers can access both live streaming events as well as events from WWNLive's on-demand library, dating back to 2003.

On November 22, 2016, it was announced that WWNLive would be debuting a new promotion named Style Battle on January 7, 2017. Also announced was the creation of the WWN Championship on April 1, 2017.

On September 21, 2017, it was reported that FloSports had filed a $1 million lawsuit against WWNLive for breach of contract and alleged misrepresentation of iPPV and VOD buyrates. WWNLive, meanwhile, claimed that FloSports had failed to live up to their contractual obligations. Because of the lawsuit, FloSports pulled all future WWNLive events from its streaming service. The following December, WWNLive launched a replacement streaming service, Club WWN.

In July 2020, Evolve's assets were sold to WWE and Sapolsky left WWN. A few weeks later, WWN announced the creation of Grindhouse, a new brand promoted by Eddie Kingston.

Brands

Active

Defunct

Championships
Active

Defunct

References

External links

American professional wrestling promotions
Evolve (professional wrestling)
Organizations established in 2001
2001 establishments in the United States
Internet television channels
Subscription video streaming services
Professional wrestling streaming services